Robinsonia sanea is a moth in the family Erebidae. It was described by Herbert Druce in 1895. It is found in French Guiana, Peru and Panama.

References

Moths described in 1895
Robinsonia (moth)
Arctiinae of South America